Motahaldu or Himmatpur Motahaldu is a town in City Haldwani, Nainital district in the Indian States and territories of India of Uttarakhand. It is situated on National Highway-87, viz. Rampur-Nainital National Highway and is just 8 km from Haldwani City centre. The nearest railway junction is 7 km away at Lalkuan (LKU) & nearest Airport is 16 km away at Pantnagar.

Economy 
Motahaldu has many stone factories, dairy and agricultural farms.

A Private Industrial Estate (SEZ) has been developed at Village- Padlipur in the name of "Mahaveer Audyogik Aasthan (AOP)". This industrial estate has been notified by Central Govt. of India & State Industrial Development Corporation of Uttarakhand (SIDCUL). This estate is one of its kind in the whole Nainital District.

Many industries have been set up in the estate, providing employment & better living standard to the people living in its vicinity, which further leads to the overall development of the area.
The developers of the Industrial Estate have also provided with a temple in the said premises. 

There is also a government medical centre.

Villages 
It has many villages, including Kishanpur Sakuliya, Sufi Bhagwanpur, Padampur Devalia,  Jaypurbisa and BhawanipurHarsing.

References 

Cities and towns in Nainital district
Haldwani